Sericite is the name given to very fine, ragged grains and aggregates of white (colourless) micas, typically made of muscovite, illite, or paragonite. Sericite is produced by the alteration of orthoclase or plagioclase feldspars in areas that have been subjected to hydrothermal alteration typically associated with copper, tin, or other hydrothermal ore deposits. Sericite also occurs as the fine mica that gives the sheen to phyllite and schistose metamorphic rocks.

The name comes from  Latin sericus, meaning "silken" in reference to the location from which silk was first utilized, which in turn refers to the silky sheen of rocks with abundant sericite.

References

External links
Mindat
Microscopic image

Phyllosilicates